Vera Geogriyevna Orlova (May 27, 1894September 28, 1977), married Arenskaya, was a Russian film actress, who garnered fame during the late Imperial Russian and early Soviet eras.

Having completed her education at a female grammar school, she worked as an office clerk and simultaneously took private acting lessons. In 1913–1915, she studied at the Moscow Art Theater school. She continued working there as an actress until 1924, when she transferred to the Moscow Art Theater-II, where she continued to work until 1936.

In 1945–1951, she worked at the State Theater of Film Actors.

Selected filmography
1916: The Queen of Spades, as Lise
1917: Satan Triumphant, as Inga
1917: Father Sergius, as the daughter of a merchant
1924: Aelita, as Masha
1924: The Power of Darkness, as Anjutka
1926: Prostitute, as Nadezhda
1961: When the Trees Were Tall, as a watchwoman

References

External links

Russian film actresses
Soviet film actresses
Russian silent film actresses
20th-century Russian actresses
Belarusfilm films
1894 births
1977 deaths